The Tuanku Ja'afar Cup was a cricket tournament contested by the national sides of Hong Kong, Malaysia, Singapore and Thailand. It is named in honour of the late Tuanku Jaafar, the former Yang di-Pertuan Besar of Negeri Sembilan and Yang di-Pertuan Agong (King of Malaysia) between 1994 and 1999.

History

The tournament was first played in 1991, not involving Thailand, to help the other three countries prepare for the ICC Trophy. Thailand joined the competition in the second year, and the four teams played annually until 2004, with Thailand missing in 1998 and 1999, when just three teams played, and 2002, when they were replaced by Hong Kong A. Hong Kong have won the tournament the most times, winning nine of the 14 tournaments played. Malaysia have won four times, whilst Singapore have won just once.

1991 tournament

The first Tuanku Ja'afar Cup was played on a league basis with no final. Hong Kong won the tournament, with Singapore as runners-up.

1992 tournament

The second Tuanku Ja'afar Cup saw Thailand play for the first time. Hong Kong were again the winners, with Malaysia runners-up this time.

1993 tournament

The 1993 Tuanku Ja'afar Cup was the last to be played without a final. Hong Kong won the third consecutive time. Singapore were runners-up.

1994 tournament

The 1994 tournament was the first to have a final after the initial league phase. Hong Kong and Singapore topped the table after the group stage, and with Hong Kong unbeaten on home turf and with a 107 run win over Singapore under their belts, they were favourites to lift the cup, but Singapore triumphed in the final by two wickets.

Final result

1995 tournament

The 1995 tournament was won by Malaysia for the first time. They beat Hong Kong in the final.

1996 tournament

The tournament was held in Singapore for the second time in 1996, with Hong Kong beating the hosts by 20 runs in the final. Malaysia finished third and Thailand finished last. The tournament saw some record performances in the match between Hong Kong and Thailand. Hong Kong scored 415/5, the highest team score in the history of the competition. Riaz Farcy scored 178 in that match, the highest individual score in the history of the competition.

Final result

1997 tournament

The 1997 tournament was won by Malaysia for the second time. They beat Singapore in the final. This was the first tournament in which Hong Kong didn't finish in the top two.

1998 tournament

Thailand did not participate in the 1998 tournament, with their place taken by a HKCA President's XI. Hong Kong won on home soil, beating Singapore in the final. The KJCA President's XI finished third, with Malaysia in last place.

Final result

1999 tournament

The 1999 tournament in Kuala Lumpur was one affected by rain. The first round match between Hong Kong and Malaysia was completely abandoned, and the other two matches were both reduced. The final was washed out in Hong Kong's innings against Malaysia. Hong Kong were awarded the title as they were top of the group stage. Thailand were again absent, but they were not replaced this time.

2000 tournament

The 2000 tournament was held in Singapore, and Thailand played for the first time since 1997. Malaysia won the tournament, beating Hong Kong in the final. Singapore finished third and Thailand finished last.

Final result

2001 tournament

Like the 1999 tournament, the 2001 tournament in Thailand was heavily affected by the rain. Hong Kong won the tournament despite only playing one match, due to a superior net run rate in the opening round of matches, which was the only one completed.

2002 tournament

The 2002 tournament was hosted and won by Hong Kong, who beat Singapore in the final. Thailand withdrew from the tournament, and were replaced by Hong Kong A. The Hong Kong A side did not participate in the tournament proper, playing unofficial matches against Malaysia and Singapore, though the match against Singapore was rained off.

Points table

Final result

2003 tournament

The 2003 tournament was held in Kuala Lumpur. Thailand returned after missing the 2002 tournament and Hong Kong won for the third consecutive year, beating Malaysia in the final.

Final result

2004 tournament

The final tournament was held in Singapore in May 2004. Malaysia won after beating Hong Kong in the final. With Hong Kong, Malaysia and Singapore having increasing international commitments in tournaments such as the ACC Fast Track Countries Tournament, ACC Twenty20 Cup and ACC Trophy, it seems unlikely that the tournament will return to the schedules.

Final result

Records

Highest team score: 415/5 by Hong Kong against Thailand, 1996
Lowest team score: 63 all out by Thailand against Malaysia, 2004
Highest individual score: 178 by Riaz Farcy for Hong Kong against Thailand, 1996
Best bowling in an innings: 7/15 by Roy Lamsam for Hong Kong against Singapore, 2004

See also

Saudara Cup – an annual three-day match played between Malaysia and Singapore
Stan Nagaiah Trophy – an annual series of one-day matches played between Malaysia and Singapore
ACC Trophy – a biennial one-day tournament involving all national teams from Asia
ACC Twenty20 Cup – a biennial tournament, similar to the ACC Trophy but playing Twenty20 cricket.
 2022 Malaysia Quadrangular Series between Malaysia, Thailand, Bhutan and Maldives

References

Cricket in Malaysia
Cricket in Singapore
International cricket competitions
Recurring sporting events established in 1991
Recurring events disestablished in 2004